The South Coast Track is a bushwalking track located in the South Coast region of Tasmania, Australia. The  track traverses remote wilderness within the Southwest National Park, part of the Tasmanian Wilderness World Heritage Site, and is managed as a wilderness walk. The Tasmanian Parks & Wildlife Service recommend that experienced bushwalkers can take six-to-eight days to cover the track in one direction.

The track follows the wild southern coastline of Tasmania. It crosses two mountain ranges to avoid sections of impassable coastline and also crosses long sections of open plains behind the coastline. It only follows the coast itself where there are beaches. The track may be combined with the Port Davey Track as a long continuous trek requiring around eight to fourteen days.

Features and location

From this point the track heads south towards Cox Bight, and then east to the Louisa River. Continuing east and after crossing the Ironbound Range, the track reaches Deadmans Bay and then to Prion Beach, requiring a boat crossing of a narrow ocean inlet. Continuing further east by south, the track reaches Granite Beach and then South Cape Rivulet within South Cape Bay. From this point, the track heads east by north to  where it reaches its eastern terminus.

Most walkers fly into Melaleuca and walk out to avoid being trapped there without food in poor weather.

See also

 List of bushwalking tracks of Tasmania

References

External links 
 South Coast Track Information
 

Hiking and bushwalking tracks in Tasmania
Southern Tasmania
South coast of Tasmania